At least two ships of the French Navy have been named Bourrasque:

 , a  launched in 1901 and struck in 1921.
 , a  launched in 1925 and sunk in 1940.

French Navy ship names